The 2002 Cherwell District Council election took place on 2 May 2002 to elect members of  Cherwell District Council in Oxfordshire, England. The whole council was up for election with boundary changes since the last election in 2000 reducing the number of seats by 2. The Conservative Party stayed in overall control of the council.

The election saw the two independent councillors and one independent Socialist councillor stand down from the council after deciding not to seek re-election. When the candidates were announced, five Conservatives including the leader of the council, George Reynolds, were unopposed in the election. The results saw the Conservative Party consolidate their control of the council after winning 37 of the 50 seats on the council including all of the seats in Bicester.

Election result

Ward results

References

2002 English local elections
2002
2000s in Oxfordshire